National Route 36 (Korean: 국도 제 36호선, Gukdo Je Samsip-yuk(36) Hoseon) is a national highway in South Korea connects Boryeong to Sejong City, Cheongju, Chungju, and Uljin. It established on 31 August 1971.

Main stopovers
South Chungcheong Province
 Boryeong - Cheongyang County - Gongju
Sejong City
 Janggun-myeon - Hansol-dong - Yeongi-myeon - Yeonseo-myeon - Jochiwon-eup
North Chungcheong Province
 Cheongju (Heungdeok District - Seowon District - Sangdang District - Cheongwon District) - Jeungpyeong County - Eumseong County - Chungju - Jecheon - Danyang County
North Gyeongsang Province
 Yeongju - Bonghwa County - Uljin County

Major intersections 

 (■): Motorway 
 IS: Intersection()
 3-IS: 3-way Intersection()
 4-IS: 4-way Intersection()
 5-IS: 5-way Intersection()
 6-IS: 6-way Intersection()
 7-IS: 7-way Intersection()
 IC: Interchange()

South Chungcheong Province and Sejong City

North Chungcheong Province 

  Motorway

North Gyeongsang Province 

  Motorway

References

36
Roads in South Chungcheong
Roads in Sejong
Roads in North Chungcheong
Roads in North Gyeongsang